Diadegma discoocellellae is a wasp first described by Henry Lorenz Viereck in 1911.

References

discoocellellae
Insects described in 1911